This is a list of Members of Parliament (MPs) elected to the tenth and last parliament in the reign of Queen Elizabeth I in 1601.

The Parliament met on 7 October 1601 and lasted until 29 December 1601 when it was dissolved.

List of constituencies and members

See also
List of MPs elected to the English parliament in 1604
The Golden Speech

References
D. Brunton & D. H. Pennington, Members of the Long Parliament (London: George Allen & Unwin, 1954)
Cobbett's Parliamentary history of England, from the Norman Conquest in 1066 to the year 1803 (London: Thomas Hansard, 1808)
Browne Willis Notitia parliamentaria, or, An history of the counties, cities, and boroughs in England and Wales: ... The whole extracted from mss. and printed evidences 1750 pp146-155

17th-century English parliaments
1601 in England
1601 in politics
1601